Florentine flogging is a two-handed style of flagellation used in BDSM, inspired by a double sword form salute from Kung Fu.  It involves the rhythmic use of a pair of matching floggers, one in each hand of the person administering the flogging. The term is an allusion to Florentine fencing, a Society for Creative Anachronism style where the fighter uses two swords, one in each hand.

Mechanically, the rotation of the wrists, with hands in close proximity, is similar to the close-hand techniques of Poi. Because of this, the technique can be used to intensify the sensation of the strikes by repeating them in a manner which has a higher rhythm and strike rate than other methods. Although it may be believed that the intensity of this technique should only be done after the person receiving the flogging has been warmed-up (meaning to slowly, gradually bringing the blood up to the surface of the skin as to not cause injury), a slower rhythm with gentle impact can be used to great warm-up effect. The skin will become very warm to the touch when this has happened, and in some people, the skin may become pink. One must always be careful to check when it is safe to intensify the strike impact of this specialized technique.

The strikes of the floggers come on the downward stroke or the 'top' of each figure-eight flail and are thrown to avoid striking the kidney or spinal area of the subject's back as well as avoiding any areas near joints or bone. This type of flagellation should only be done on the muscular regions of the body as to prevent serious injury.

This is best done with a set of matching (identical, identically weighted or similar) floggers so that strike pressures can be most easily controlled.

There are different flogging styles. The most common ones are two point Florentine Flogging and four point Florentine Flogging.

References

BDSM terminology
Whipping